Money Ratnam (English translation: Money Diamond) is a 2014 Indian Malayalam comedy thriller film, directed by debutant Santhosh Nair starring Fahadh Faasil and Niveda Thomas. Touted to be a road movie,  which is loosely adapted from Hindi movie Ek Chalis Ki Last Local, it narrates a story that happen in a 24-hour time frame during a journey from Munnar to Marayur. Scripted by Anil Narayanan and Ajith C. Lokesh, the music department was handled by Prashanth Pillai, while the camera was helmed by Neel D. Kunha. Money Ratnam is the 100th film of the production house Century Films. The film's locations include Udumalpet, Pollachi, Ernakulam, and Sholayar. It released on 26 September 2014 as an Onam release.

Plot
Neil John Samuel is a showroom executive in Ernakulam. After the New Year party, fortunately Neel gets a bag of money. With the money, Neil reaches a village in Tamil Nadu. Four people with an intention to buy diamonds also arrive at the same spot. All are connected with the cash which is in the hands of Neil.

Cast

Fahadh Faasil as Neil John Samuel, sales manager in a Benz showroom 
Niveda Thomas as Pia Mammen
Renji Panicker as Isaac
Chembil Ashokan as Joppan Kannamali
Sasi Kalinga as Kareem
Joju George as Makudi Das
Sunil Sukhada as the astrologer
Kochu Preman as Gopi
Leema Babu as Divya
Balu Varghese as Joppan's nephew
Dinesh Prabhakar as Cleetus 
Sudhi Koppa as Cleetus' friend
Sidhartha Siva as the taxi driver 
Jaffar Idukki as the Tempo driver
Reena Basheer as Salomi, Issac's wife
Aarthi as the scooty driver 
Navin Kumar as Kumar, Divya's love interest
Nandhan Unni as Suni, Das' brother
Dileep Shankar as Tony
Archana Menon as Neil's mom
Indira Thampy as the mother in the taxi

Home video
Manorama Music  released the VCD, DVD and Blu-ray of the movie on 5 December 2014.

Critical reception
The Hindu wrote, "Money Ratnam has its moments, offers a few laughs, does not give you one of those splitting headaches and is your money’s worth". The Times of India gave 3 stars out of 5 and wrote, "The film is not logically perfect, but it sure brings out the slapstick comedian in Fahad, hitherto untapped...the director shows good promise and the film is worth a watch, solely for the humour". Rediff gave 2.5 stars  out of 5 and called the film "an above-average, unpretentious entertainer". The New Indian Express wrote, "Despite...minor hiccups, it is a comedy film, entertaining and engaging throughout".

References

External links
 

2014 films
Films shot in Tamil Nadu
Films shot in Kochi
Films shot in Palakkad
Films shot in Pollachi
Films shot in Coimbatore
2010s Malayalam-language films